Sofiane, alternatives Soufian, Soufiane, Sofian, Sefiane, Sofyane, Sufian, or Sofyan , Soufyane is a given Arabic name. It may refer to:

Mononym
Sofiane (rapper), full name Sofiane Zermani, French rapper of Algerian origin
Sofiane (singer), full name Sofiane Tadjine-Lambert, French singer and Star Academy and Les Anges de la télé-réalité contestant

First name
Soufian
Soufian Benyamina (born 1990), German football player
Soufian Echcharaf (born 1994), Dutch football player
Soufian El Hassnaoui (born 1989), Dutch-Moroccan professional football player
Soufian Moro (born 1993), Dutch football player
Soufiane
Soufiane Alloudi (born 1983), Moroccan football player
Soufiane Dadda (born 1990), Dutch-Moroccan football player 
, Belgian rapper of Moroccan descent
Soufiane Kone (born 1980), French football player
Soufiane Kourdou (born 1985), Moroccan basketball player
Soufiane Laghmouchi (born 1990), Moroccan football player
Soufiane Sankhon, French karateka

Sofian
 (born 1980), better known as Sofian, Norwegian soul artist of Algerian origin
Sofian Taïbi (born 1987), Algerian football player

Sofiane
Sofiane Attaf (born 1983), Algerian football player
Sofiane el Azizi (born 1979), Algerian fencer and Olympian
Sofiane Azzedine (born 1980), Algerian football player
Sofiane Bencharif (born 1986), French-Algerian football player
Sofiane Bengoureïne (born 1984), Algerian football player
Sofiane Bezzou (born 1981), French-born Algerian football player 
Sofiane Boufal (born 1993), French-born Moroccan football player
Sofiane Cherfa (born 1984), Algerian football player 
Sofiane Daid (born 1982), Algerian swimmer and Olympian
Sofiane Daoud (born 1975), Algerian football player
Sofiane Djebarat (born 1983), Algerian football player
Sofiane el-Fassila, also known as Harek Zoheir, (1975–2007), second-in-command of Al Qaeda in North Africa
Sofiane Feghouli (born 1989), Algerian football player
Sofiane Hamdi, Algerian Paralympic athlete 
Sofiane Hanitser (born 1984), Algerian football player
Sofiane Hanni (born 1990), Algerian football player 
Sofiane Harkat (born 1984), Algerian football player 
Sofiane Khedairia (born 1989), Algerian football player
Sofiane Khelili (born 1989), Algerian football player
Sofiane Labidi (born 1977), Tunisian sprinter
Sofiane Melliti (born 1978), Tunisian football player
Sofiane Sebihi (born 1979), Algerian boxer
 Sofiane Sylve (born 1976), French ballet dancer
Sofiane Younès (born 1982), Algerian football player

Sofiene
Sofiene Chaari (1962–2011), Tunisian actor
Sofiene Zaaboub (born 1983), French-Algerian football player

Family name
Soufiane
Ahmed Soufiane, Qatari football player
Sofiane
Youssef Sofiane (born 1984), French-Algerian football player

See also
 Sufian (disambiguation)
 Sufi (disambiguation)
 Sufism (disambiguation)
Sufyan